Klaus von Dohnanyi (born 23 June 1928) is a German politician of the Social Democratic Party (SPD). He served as mayor of Hamburg between 1981 and 1988.

Early life and career
Dohnanyi was born in Hamburg, the son of Christine von Dohnanyi and Hans von Dohnanyi, a lawyer, and a nephew of the Lutheran theologian Dietrich Bonhoeffer. His grandfather was the celebrated Hungarian composer Ernst von Dohnányi. Both his father and uncle were executed in 1945 as members of the anti-Nazi German Resistance. His younger brother Christoph is a conductor. He also has a sister, Barbara.

After studying law at the University of Munich, and later in the United States at Columbia, Stanford and Yale universities, Dohnanyi started his career with the Max Planck Institute for International Private Law. He then moved to Ford Motor Company, the car manufacturer, working for the company in both Detroit and Cologne where he was head of the Planning Division. From 1960 to 1967, he was a Managing Partner of the Institute for Market Research and Management Consulting in Munich.

Political career
In 1969 Dohnanyi was elected to the German Federal Parliament (the Bundestag) from the state of Rhineland-Palatinate and served in the Economics ministry as state secretary, and later as Federal Minister of Education and Science until 1981. In 1981, Dohnanyi was elected First Mayor of his home city, and thus Minister-President of Hamburg, one of the federal States of Germany. He served two terms as First Mayor, from 24 June 1981 until 8 June 1988.

After the fall of the Berlin Wall and with German unification, Dohnanyi became involved with the restructuring programme in East Germany, and from 1993 to 1996 was a special adviser on Market Economy and State to the Board of the Treuhandanstalt  and BvS, its successor company, responsible for privatising state-owned companies in the former East Germany.

In 2004, Dohnanyi co-chaired (alongside Edgar Most) a government-appointed commission which presented Minister Manfred Stolpe, then serving as cabinet minister charged with eastern reconstruction, with a 29-page report ("Recommendations for a Change in Direction for Development East").

Other activities (selection)
 AIESEC Germany, Member of the Board of Trustees 
 Berlin-Brandenburg Academy of Sciences and Humanities, Member of the Senate
 Bertelsmann Stiftung, Member of the Advisory Board (1989–1998)
 Friedrich Ebert Foundation (FES), Member of the Board of Trustees
 Hamburger Theaterfestival, Member of the Board of Trustees

References

External links

 

1928 births
Living people
German people of Hungarian descent
Mayors of Hamburg
Education ministers of Germany
Klaus von Dohnanyi
Members of the Bundestag for Rhineland-Palatinate
Members of the Bundestag for the Social Democratic Party of Germany
Ludwig Maximilian University of Munich alumni
People from Hamburg
Max Planck Society alumni